The Colt Runabout was an American Brass-era automobile built in Yonkers, New York, in 1907. by William Mason Turner.

It was a two-seater, with a long hood and short tail (where a pair of spare tires were mounted), characteristic of the period, and weighing in at only 1800 lb (816 kg). It was priced at US$1500, compared to $650 for the high-volume Oldsmobile Runabout and the two-seat Ford Model C "doctor's car" at US$850, but below the US$1600 of the Oakland 40, and well below even American's lowest-priced model, which was US$4250 (its highest was US$5250).

The Runabout's 477-in3 (7819 cc) (4.5×5.0-inch, 114×127 mm) six-cylinder produced 40 hp (30 kW), and Colt claimed the car would hit 60 mph (100 km/h), a considerable feat in 1907.

See also 
List of defunct United States automobile manufacturers

References

Brass Era vehicles
Defunct motor vehicle manufacturers of the United States
1900s cars
Defunct companies based in New York (state)
History of Yonkers, New York
Motor vehicle manufacturers based in New York (state)